Robert Eberle (1815–1862), a German animal painter, was born at Meersburg, on Lake Constance on 22 July 1815. He died at Eberingg, near Munich, on 19 September 1862.

Life 
He was first instructed by J.J. Bidermann at Constance, and afterwards went to Munich in 1830, where he studied from nature and the works of Van de Velde and Du Jardin. He spent three months in America (1848), and then settled at Eberfing, near Munich, where he died from an accidental pistol shot. He especially excelled in painting sheep, and there is a Shepherdess by him in the Modern Gallery at Munich.

Works : Shepherd with Herd Returning Home (1840) ; Grain Harvest (1848) ; Morning at Weinheim, Leaving the Alp (1849) ; Frightened Sheep, Cattle Returning Home, Sheep Resting (1850) ;

Return from the Fields (1851) ; Alp on Benedicten Wall, Goats Starting for Pasture, Sheep Resting at Noon, Evening in Pasture, Sheep Resting and Shepherd Boy (1852) ; Sheep During Storm, Early Snow (1853) ; Shepherd and Sheep (1854) ; Shepherd's Dinner (1855) ; Sheep Driven by Dog (1850) ; Village; in the Morning, Peasant and Shepherd (1857) ; Sheep Driven over Precipice by an Eagle (1858), Carlsrube Gallery ; Village Scene (1859) ; Suabian Shepherd with Herd (1860), New Pinakothek, Munich ; Cows returning from Pasture (1861).

See also
 List of German painters

References
 

1815 births
1859 deaths
19th-century German painters
19th-century German male artists
German male painters
Animal artists
People from Bodenseekreis